The lotus-eaters were a race of people in Greek mythology.

Lotus-eaters or Lotus eater may also refer to:

Film and television 
 The Lotus Eater (film), a 1921 silent film
 The Lotus Eaters (film), a 1993 Canadian film
 The Lotus Eaters (TV series), a 1970s British drama series
 "The Lotus Eaters" (Ulysses 31), a 1982 episode of Ulysses 31
 Lotus Eaters (film), a 2011 British film
"Lotus Eaters", episode seven of 2018 Freeform series Cloak & Dagger
"The Lotus-Eaters", episode five of the 2021 HBO series The White Lotus

Literature 
 "The Lotus Eater", a 1945 short story by W. Somerset Maugham
 "The Lotus Eaters" (Weinbaum), a 1935 short story by Stanley G. Weinbaum
 The Lotus Eaters (novel), a 2010 novel by Tatjana Soli
 "The Lotos-Eaters", an 1832 poem by Alfred, Lord Tennyson
 "Lotus Eaters" (Ulysses episode) an episode in James Joyce's novel Ulysses
 Lotus Eaters, a Touhou Project manga series

Music 
 The Lotus Eaters (band), an English new wave band
 Lotus Eater, a Scottish heavy metal band
 Lotus Eaters (band), an American experimental electroacoustic group
 Lotus Eaters, an instrumental for guitars by Andrew York
 Keane (band), formerly The Lotus Eaters, an English alternative rock band
 The Lotus Eaters, a 2004 Dead Can Dance tribute album
 "The Lotus Eaters", a song by Dead Can Dance from Dead Can Dance (1981–1998)
 "The Lotus Eaters", a song by Nevermore from Dreaming Neon Black
 "The Lotus Eater", a song by Opeth from Watershed
 "Lotus Eater", a song by Foster the People from Sacred Hearts Club